102P/Shoemaker, also known as Shoemaker 1, is a periodic comet in the Solar System.  It was first seen in 1984 and then again in 1991.  Images taken of it in 1999 were not recognized until 2006 when it was once again observed.  It was unexpectedly dim in each of these returns.

References

External links
Orbital simulation from JPL (Java) / Horizons Ephemeris
102P/Shoemaker 1 – Seiichi Yoshida @ aerith.net
102P at Kronk's Cometography 
IAU Minor Planet Center, Minor Planet Electronic Circular No. 2006-O54 giving questionable observations from 1999/2000 and new observations from 2006.
IAU Central Bureau for Astronomical Telegrams Circular No. 5361 giving visual magnitude estimates for 1991 observations. 
IAU Central Bureau for Astronomical Telegrams Circular No. 5336 giving calculated orbit based on 1991 observations.
IAU Central Bureau for Astronomical Telegrams Circular No. 5286 Describing recovery of 102P/Shoemaker in 1991
IAU Central Bureau for Astronomical Telegrams Circular No. 4017. Describing more visual magnitude estimates and orbital parameters from 1984.
IAU Central Bureau for Astronomical Telegrams Circular No. 4002. Describing visual magnitude estimates of comet from 1984.
IAU Central Bureau for Astronomical Telegrams Circular No. 4000. Describing positions of comet observed in 1984. Also mentions close pass of Jupiter calculated to have occurred in 1980.
IAU Central Bureau for Astronomical Telegrams Circular No. 3998 Describing the initial calculation of the comet's orbit in 1984

Periodic comets
0102
102P
102P
Comets in 2013
19840927